Filomicrobium fusiforme is a Gram-negative, aerobic, motile bacteria from the genus of Filomicrobium which was isolated from brackish water in Germany.

References

External links
Type strain of Filomicrobium fusiforme at BacDive -  the Bacterial Diversity Metadatabase

 

Hyphomicrobiales
Bacteria described in 1988